Taytaba (also spelled Teitaba) was a Palestinian-Arab village in the Safad Subdistrict, located 5 kilometers north of Safad. It was depopulated during the 1947–1948 Civil War in Mandatory Palestine in May 1948 under Operation Hiram. In 1945 it had a population of 530 and a total area of 8,453 dunams, 99.8% of which was Arab-owned.

It was situated in a rocky area located along the crest of a basaltic hill that overlooks Wadi Taytaba, a tributary of Wadi Waqqas, to the southeast. It was connected to a highway leading to Safad via a secondary road and connected to many of the surrounding villages through secondary roads as well.

History
Taytaba has been suggested as the Biblical site where Elijah received his patronymic of "Tishbite."

Ottoman era
During the early Ottoman era in 1596, Taytaba was part of the nahiyah ("subdistrict") of Jira, part of Safad Sanjak,  and paid taxes on goats and beehives, in addition to a fixed amount; a total of 5,220  akçe. It had a population of 73 households and 6 bachelors, an estimated 434 persons. All were  Muslims.

In 1838,  Robinson noted the village when he travelled in the region,  as a village located in the Safad district.

Its population decreased to roughly 200, all Muslims, by the late Ottoman era when French explorer Victor Guérin visited in 1870. The houses were made of basalt and there was a plantation of figs. An Islamic shrine stood on a nearby hill, with blocks of basalt apparently carved by hand. At that time, Taytaba's inhabitants cultivated gardens to the west of the village site.

A population list from about 1887 showed  Teitaba to have  about  455  inhabitants;  all Muslims.

British Mandate era
During the British Mandatory period in the early 20th-century, the houses of the village were built from stone and adobe brick. The inhabitants main source of income and sustenance was from agriculture. 
A mosque and a boys' elementary school (the latter was built during the British period) was located in the southern section of Taytaba.

In the 1922 census of Palestine  Taitaba  had a population of 269; all Muslim, increasing in the 1931 census to  364, still all  Muslims,  in  a total of 60 houses.

In the 1945 statistics, its population was 530 Muslims,  with a total of 8,453 dunams of land. 585 dunams were cultivated for orchards and 5,175 dunams for cereals; a  total of 5,763 dunams were cultivable, while the  built-up areas of the village amounted to 61 dunams.

1948 War and aftermath
In February 1948 Taytaba reportedly hosted Arab volunteers participating in the 1948 Arab-Israeli War according to the New York Times. The newspaper stated that on 18 February a British Army patrol approaching Taytaba was attacked by Arab fighters prompting the dispatch of British reinforcements. British forces eventually withdrew and no casualties were reported. On 15 February a unit from the Haganah (precursor to the Israeli Army) attacked Taytaba following a mass killing they committed at the nearby Palestinian-Arab village of Sa'sa'. No details of the attack on Taytaba were mentioned the Associated Press report.

It is not known exactly when Taytaba was captured by Israel or emptied of its residents, but most likely fell in May during the later stages of the Israeli offensive Operation Yiftach. According to Palestinian historian Walid Khalidi, as such its residents probably evacuated or were expelled between the capture of Safad on 11 May or the end of the operation on 25 May. The Palestinian historian Nafez Nazzal contends that most of Taytaba's inhabitants left the village in early May as a result of the massacre at Ein al-Zeitun.  Following the news of the massacre, many families fled to temporarily camp in the fields between the village and nearby Ras al-Ahmar. However, armed men remained in Taytaba until retreating after Jewish forces attacked in October.

In 1992  Khalidi noted about Taytaba: "The village site contains the stone rubble of razed houses. A few olive trees still stand, growing among the thorny plants and grass. Part of the surrounding land is used by the settlement of  Dalton for agriculture and pastures; other parts are wooded."

Archaeology
To the east of Taytaba lies the ruins (khirba) of al-Tasarif.

References

Bibliography

External links
  Welcome To Taytaba
 Taytaba,   Zochrot
 Taytaba, Dr. Khalil Rizk
Survey of Western Palestine, Map 4:     IAA, Wikimedia commons

Arab villages depopulated during the 1948 Arab–Israeli War
District of Safad